Chalatenango can refer to:
 Chalatenango Department in El Salvador
 Chalatenango, Chalatenango, a city in El Salvador
 C.D. Chalatenango, a Salvadoran professional association football club based in the city